The Lasse Oksanen trophy is an ice hockey trophy awarded by the Finnish Liiga to the best player of the season during regular season play.

Trophy winners:

1993-94: Esa Keskinen (TPS)

1994-95: Saku Koivu (TPS)

1995-96: Juha Riihijärvi (Lukko)

1996-97: Jani Hurme (TPS)

1997-98: Raimo Helminen (Ilves)

1998-99: Jan Caloun (HIFK)

1999-00: Kai Nurminen (TPS)

2000-01: Tony Virta (TPS)

2001-02: Janne Ojanen (Tappara)

2002-03: Antti Miettinen (HPK)

2003-04: Timo Pärssinen (HIFK)

2004-05: Tim Thomas (Jokerit)

2005-06: Tony Salmelainen (HIFK)

2006-07: Cory Murphy (HIFK)

2007-08: Ville Leino (Jokerit)

2008-09: Juuso Riksman (Jokerit)

2009-10: Jori Lehterä (Tappara)

2010-11: Ville Peltonen (HIFK)

2011-12: Tomas Zaborsky (Ässät)

2012-13: Antti Raanta (Ässät)

2013-14: Michael Keränen (Ilves)

2014-15: Kim Hirschovits (Blues)

2015-16: Kristian Kuusela (Tappara)

2016-17: Mika Pyörälä (Kärpät)

2017-18: Julius Junttila (Kärpät)

2018-19: Oliwer Kaski (Pelicans)

2019-20: Justin Danforth (Lukko)

2020-21: Robin Press (Lukko)

2021-22: Petrus Palmu (Jukurit)

2022-23: Michael Joly (HPK)

References

Liiga trophies and awards